Lasiancistrus heteracanthus is a species of armored catfish found in the Napo River of Ecuador and Peru.  This species grows to a length of  SL.

References
 

Ancistrini
Fish of South America
Freshwater fish of Ecuador
Freshwater fish of Peru
Fish described in 1869
Taxa named by Albert Günther